WJXR 92.1 FM is a radio station located in Macclenny, Florida in Baker County. The station is owned by Norberto Sanchez, through licensee Norsan WJXR, LLC. On December 31, 2014 at 10:00 pm ET, the station flipped the format to Spanish tropical, simulcasting WEWC.

WJXR as The Bargain Channel
The bulk of the station's airtime was devoted to The Bargain Channel program, which consisted of broadcasting cut-rate prices on a wide variety of items, similar to the "Trading Post"-type programs that was the genesis of cable shopping channels like the Home Shopping Network. The station was purchased in 1985 by Sarah and Greg Perich and was converted soon thereafter to a larger, more bargain-oriented format.

As The Bargain Channel its popularity rested, in part, in the idiosyncrasies of the hosts and the matchless scope of the items being sold. For example, the Bargain Channel has marketed large quantities of batteries, "miscellaneous" meats, tiger's eye men's rings, and burlap sacks. Many of the products on WJXR were sold in seemingly randomly matched packages, such as 4 packs of miscellaneous chicken combined with a 2-person vacation to either Disney World or Sea World for only $109. These packages are known as "deals". Callers will often purchase items by saying "I want two deals of them batteries" or "can I get two deals of the pizza pans??"

Trivia
WJXR's call letters stand for "Jacksonville Radio."
The station's call letters were often used by hosts to greet callers.  Due to their often thick Southern dialect, hosts habitually pronounced the letters as the now-signature "Dubjexar?". Another popular caller greeting was "Welcome to the Bargain Channel," with "tothebarginchannel" slurred together in a humorous fashion.
WJXR used to have a country format, and had the slogan "Shark Country." The station logo was a shark dressed as a cowboy.
A mascot, a chihuahua named Delia Diamonique, used to appear at remote broadcasts.

References

External links
Official website

A clip of WJXR The Bargain Channel store from Jacksonville Florida
A caller requests an out-of-stock item live on air in 1997

JXR
Radio stations established in 1979
1979 establishments in Florida